Dindoshi Assembly constituency is one of the 288 Vidhan Sabha (legislative assembly) constituencies in Maharashtra state in western India.

Overview
Dindoshi constituency is one of the 26 Vidhan Sabha constituencies located in the Mumbai Suburban district.

Dindoshi is part of the Mumbai North West Lok Sabha constituency along with five other Vidhan Sabha segments, namely Goregaon, Versova, Jogeshwari East, Andheri East and Andheri West in the Mumbai Suburban district.

Members of Legislative Assembly

Election results

2019 result

2014 result

2009 result

See also
 Dindoshi
 List of constituencies of Maharashtra Vidhan Sabha

References

Assembly constituencies of Mumbai
Politics of Mumbai Suburban district
Assembly constituencies of Maharashtra